Carbon Hill is an unincorporated community and census-designated place (CDP) in central Ward Township, Hocking County, Ohio, United States. It has a post office with the ZIP code 43111. As of the 2010 census the population of the CDP was 233.

State Route 278, located on the western edge of Carbon Hill, is its main north-south street.

Demographics

History
Carbon Hill was laid out in 1873. Coal (a carbon-based fuel) was extensively mined there. This industry accounts for the community's name. A post office called Carbon Hill has been in operation since 1879.

Public services
The residents of Carbon Hill are served by the Nelsonville-York City School District and Nelsonville-York High School.

References

Census-designated places in Ohio
Census-designated places in Hocking County, Ohio
Coal towns in Ohio